Pistoia railway station is the station of Pistoia in Piazza Dante. It is on the Viareggio–Florence railway, which connects Florence and Viareggio and it is at the beginning of the Porrettana railway to Bologna.

Overview
The station has a subway linking platform 1 with platforms 2 and 3. It has no lifts for the disabled. The station is heavily used by students going to Prato, Florence, Lucca and Pisa. During the summer traffic is concentrated towards Versilia and Viareggio. It is used by three million passengers each year. Only regional trains stop at the station since it is near Florence, which is served by long-distance trains.

Gallery

See also

History of rail transport in Italy
List of railway stations in Tuscany
Rail transport in Italy
Railway stations in Italy

External links

Railway stations in Tuscany
Railway station